The 1959–60 Divizia B was the 20th season of the second tier of the Romanian football league system.

The league was expanded from two series to three series of 14 teams. At the end of the season the winners of the series promoted to Divizia A and the last two places from each series relegated to Regional Championship.

Team changes

To Divizia B
Promoted from Divizia C
 CFR Pașcani
 Victoria Buzău
 Știința București
 Chimia Făgăraș
 Rapid Cluj
 Metalul Oțelu Roșu
 Sportul Muncitoresc Radăuți
 SNM Constanța
 Jiul Craiova
 Carpați Sinaia
 CFR Cluj
 Drobeta-Turnu Severin
 Dinamo Miliție București
 Recolta Carei
 Metalul Târgoviște

Relegated from Divizia A
 Știința Timișoara

From Divizia B
Relegated to Regional Championship
 —

Promoted to Divizia A
 Minerul Lupeni

Teams spared from relegation 
Știința Cluj was spared from relegation to Divizia B, after the merge of TAROM București with Locomotiva GR București.

Renamed teams 
CSA Sibiu was renamed as ASA Sibiu.

Jiul Craiova was renamed as CS Craiova.

Pompierul București was renamed as Dinamo Obor București.

Victoria Suceava was renamed as Dinamo Suceava.

Other teams 
TAROM București merged with its mother club, Locomotiva GR București, being absorbed.

Dinamo Miliție București and Dinamo Pitești merged, the first one being absorbed by the second one.

League tables

Serie I

Serie II

Serie III

See also 

 1959–60 Divizia A

References

Liga II seasons
Romania
2